Supardi Nasir Bujang (born 9 April 1983) is an Indonesian professional footballer who plays as a full-back for Liga 2 club PSMS Medan. He debuted on the Indonesia national team as a substitute at the 2007 AFF Championship.

Personal life
Nasir is a Muslim who observes the Islamic month of Ramadan.

Career Statistics

Club

Honours

Clubs
Sriwijaya
 Indonesia Super League: 2011–12
 Indonesian Community Shield: 2010
 Indonesian Inter Island Cup: 2010
Persib Bandung
 Indonesia Super League: 2014
 President's Cup: 2015

References

External links
 

1983 births
Living people
Sportspeople from the Bangka Belitung Islands
Indonesian Muslims
Indonesian footballers
2007 AFC Asian Cup players
Association football defenders
Liga 1 (Indonesia) players
Indonesia international footballers
Sriwijaya F.C. players
PSMS Medan players
Persib Bandung players
Indonesian Super League-winning players